Belgium competed at the 1900 Summer Olympics in Paris, France.
It was the first appearance of the European nation.  Belgium was represented in France by 78 athletes, all of them male, who competed in 11 disciplines.  They comprised 95 entries in 28 events.

Medalists

Additionally Belgian athletes won bronze medal as a part of football Mixed Team Université libre de Bruxelles.

Results by event

Aquatics

Swimming

A man with the surname Hermand was Belgium's first Olympic swimmer. He competed in the 4000 metre freestyle but did not finish his first round heat.

Water polo

Brussels Swimming and Water Polo Club represented Belgium in this event.
Roster

First Round

Semi-Finals

Final

Archery

Belgium took three of seven gold medals, three of eight silver medals, and one of five bronze medals in the seven archery events that were Olympic. France and the Netherlands were the only other nations that competed, with France taking the remaining thirteen medals. Many of the French, Dutch, and Belgian competitors are unknown as their names were not recorded. 4 of the 18 Belgian archers are known by name, 14 are not. The 18 archers had 36 entries over all 7 events.

Cycling

Belgium's first cycling appearance was at the second Olympic cycling competition, 1900.  One cyclist from Belgium competed in one event, winning no medals.  Only his surname is known.

Equestrian

Belgium competed in the inaugural Olympic equestrian events, taking gold medals in 3 of 5 events. The names of 11 Belgian equestrians are unknown.

Fencing

Belgium competed in fencing at the nation's debut.  The nation sent five fencers.

Football

Université de Bruxelles represented Belgium in the football competition.  The club squad lost its only match, to Club Française, to take third in the three-team competition.

 Summary

 Match 2

 Roster
Université de Bruxelles

Gymnastics

Belgium's inaugural Olympic appearance included competing in the gymnastics portion of the program.

Rowing

Belgium, through the Royal Club Nautique de Gand, sent coxed pairs and coxed eights boats to the first Olympic rowing competition.

Shooting

Belgium's first Olympic appearance included competing in the shooting events.  Belgian shooters competed in the military pistol and military rifle sets of events.

Notes

References
 De Wael, Herman. Herman's Full Olympians: "1900 Olympians from Belgium". Accessed 11 March 2006.
 

Nations at the 1900 Summer Olympics
1900
Olympics